A colander is a kitchen utensil for draining food. It may also refer to: 

 Anton Colander (1590 – 1621), a Saxon (German) composer and organist
 David Colander (born 1947), a professor of economics at Middlebury College
 LaTasha Colander (born 1976), an American track and field athlete

See also 

 Rok Kolander (born 1980, Maribor), a Slovene rower
 Steve Kolander (1961), an American country music artist
 Kolindros, a town in Greece
 Calender, used in paper manufacturing
 Qalandar (disambiguation)